Ben Ellwood (born 12 March 1976) is a former professional tennis player from Australia.

Career
An outstanding junior, Ellwood won the boys' singles at the 1994 Australian Open, defeating Andrew Ilie in the final. He was the boys' doubles champion as well (with Mark Philippoussis) and also went on to win the boys' doubles at the 1994 Wimbledon Championships and 1994 US Open (with Philippousssis and Nicolás Lapentti, respectively). This made Ellwood the first ever player to win the boys' doubles at the Australian Open, Wimbledon Championships and US Open in the same year.

Ellwood made his Grand Slam debut in the 1995 Australian Open and came close to upsetting world number 46 Fabrice Santoro in the opening round. He lost the encounter in five sets, but had a chance to win the match in a fourth set tiebreak, which the Frenchman won 9–7. His only Grand Slam singles win came in Australia a year later, when he beat Olivier Delaître. As a doubles player he had much more success, with his best result being a quarter-finals berth at the 1999 US Open, with Michael Tebbutt as his partner. The pair defeated 10th seeds Yevgeny Kafelnikov and Daniel Vacek along the way. He also competed in the mixed doubles and made the second round of two Grand Slams in 2002, at the Australian Open and Wimbledon, both times with Evie Dominikovic. These would be the only two occasions he won a Grand Slam mixed doubles match but he only twice played with his younger sister, Annabel Ellwood, in the 1998 Australian Open and 1999 Wimbledon Championships.

On the ATP Tour, Ellwood made his only final when he and David Adams were doubles runners-up in the 2002 Delray Beach International Tennis Championships. Previously he had been a doubles quarter-finalist in Queen's with Michael Hill and made doubles semi-finals at Hong Kong in 1999 and Bucharest in 2001.

Junior Grand Slam finals

Singles: 1 (1 title)

Doubles: 4 (3 titles, 1 runner-up)

ATP career finals

Doubles: 1 (1 runner-up)

ATP Challenger and ITF Futures finals

Singles: 7 (5–2)

Doubles: 21 (12–9)

Performance timelines

Singles

Doubles

References

External links
 
 

1976 births
Living people
Australian male tennis players
Tennis people from the Australian Capital Territory
Australian Open (tennis) junior champions
Wimbledon junior champions
US Open (tennis) junior champions
Grand Slam (tennis) champions in boys' singles
Grand Slam (tennis) champions in boys' doubles
Sportspeople from Canberra